was a swordsman during the Edo period (17th century) of Japan. He was also possibly one of Miyamoto Musashi's adopted sons.

Biography

Early life
Yoemon was descended from the paternal side of Miyamoto Musashi's family and was likely adopted by him at an unknown time.

The name "Takemura" was used by Musashi during later life.

Career
Yoemon was known throughout history as one of Miyamoto Musashi's most senior students. After Musashi had left the province of Owari, Yoemon received the successorship to the School of Musashi. Two swordsman of note that had propagated the School of Musashi as disciples under Yoemon were Takemura Masatoshi and Hayashi Shiryu. After Shiryu had been trained by Yoemon for a great length of time, Shiryu received the final transmission of the Enmei ryu from Yoemon.

References

Takemura Yoemon
Miyamoto Musashi
Japanese adoptees